Microhyla superciliaris is a species of frog in the family Microhylidae. It is found in Peninsular Malaysia and Sumatra (Indonesia). Its type locality is Batu Caves, which have given it its common name, Batu Cave rice frog. The type locality is a limestone crag area surrounded by lowland forest. In Sumatra it is found in forested areas. Breeding presumably takes place is slow-flowing rivers.

References

External links
Amphibian and Reptiles of Peninsular Malaysia - Microhyla superciliaris

superciliaris
Amphibians of Indonesia
Amphibians of Malaysia
Fauna of Sumatra
Taxonomy articles created by Polbot
Amphibians described in 1928